Taiyang Subdistrict is a subdistrict of Wafangdian, Dalian District, Liaoning, China. It is based around the small town of Taiyang, Taiyangsheng or Taiyangshengxiang, which lies 19 kilometres east by road of Fuzhou, 64 kilometres north by road from Pulandian. To the east is the DFM reservoir.

See also 
 List of township-level divisions of Liaoning

References 

Township-level divisions of Liaoning
Wafangdian
Subdistricts of the People's Republic of China